Double-headed may refer to:

 Double-headed eagle, common symbol in heraldry and vexillology
 Double-heading, the use of two independently operated locomotives at the front of a train
 Dual-head, the use of two display devices with a computer
 Polycephaly, the state of having two heads
 Double-headed playing card

See also 
 Doubleheader (disambiguation)